The 1990 MTV Video Music Awards aired live on September 6, 1990, honoring the best music videos from June 2, 1989, to June 1, 1990. The show was hosted by Arsenio Hall at the Universal Amphitheatre in Los Angeles.

This year saw the elimination of yet another one of the show's original categories, Best Stage Performance in a Video.  This would turn out to be the last time an award from 1984 would be permanently eliminated (although Breakthrough Video was eliminated in 2006 and then brought back in 2009).

Janet Jackson was presented the Video Vanguard Award for her contributions and influence within music and popular culture. She also performed a controversial rendition of "Black Cat", considered "her first shocking public statement." For the second year in a row, Madonna was one of the night's biggest winners, taking home three technical awards, while Sinéad O'Connor was the other most rewarded artist of 1990, also winning three Moonmen including Video of the Year.  Meanwhile, most other winners that night took home two awards, including Aerosmith, Don Henley, The B-52s, Tears for Fears, and MC Hammer.

Regarding nominations, Madonna also had the distinction of being the most nominated artist of the night, as her video for "Vogue" received nine nominations, making it also the most nominated video of 1990.  Closely following in nominations came Aerosmith, whose video for "Janie's Got a Gun" earned eight nominations that night and took home two awards, including Viewer's Choice.

Background
MTV announced in late June that the 1990 Video Music Awards would be held on September 6 at the Universal Amphitheatre in Los Angeles, with Arsenio Hall returning as host. Nominees were announced on July 10. The ceremony marked the first time that MTV self-produced the awards show. The ceremony was preceded by a 90-minute preshow. Hosted by Downtown Julie Brown, Ed Lover, Doctor Dré, Ray Cokes, and Kurt Loder, the broadcast featured red carpet interviews, pre-taped features on the nominees, and interviews with Axl Rose and Jon Bon Jovi excerpted from Famous Last Words with Kurt Loder.

Performances

Presenters

Main show
 Don Henley – presented Best Female Video
 Robert Downey, Jr. – presented Best Video from a Film
 Pauly Shore – appeared in a pre-commercial vignette about Viewer's Choice voting procedures
 Living Colour – presented Best New Artist in a Video
 Martha Quinn – appeared in a pre-commercial vignette telling viewers what was 'coming up' on the show
 Rachel Ward and Isiah Thomas – presented Best Choreography in a Video
 Downtown Julie Brown – appeared in a pre-commercial vignette about Viewer's Choice voting procedures
 Oliver Stone – presented Best Direction in a Video
 Daisy Fuentes and Jordan Brady – appeared in a pre-commercial vignette telling viewers what was 'coming up' on the show
 Kim Basinger – presented Best Dance Video
 Nia Peeples – appeared in a pre-commercial vignette telling viewers what was 'coming up' on the show
 Billy Idol – presented Best Group Video
 Ken Ober – appeared in a pre-commercial vignette about Viewer's Choice voting procedures
 Sherilyn Fenn and Michael Ontkean – presented Breakthrough Video and Best Post-Modern Video
 Fab Five Freddy – briefly interviewed MC Hammer in a pre-commercial vignette and told viewers what was 'coming up' on the show
 Eric Bogosian – briefly spoke about censorship in the U.S. and introduced 2 Live Crew
 Christina Applegate and David Faustino – presented Best Metal/Hard Rock Video
 Riki Rachtman – appeared in a pre-commercial vignette telling viewers what was 'coming up' on the show
 Curt Smith (from Tears for Fears) and Wilson Phillips – introduced the International Viewer's Choice Award winners
 VJs Richard Wilkins (Australia), Astrid Fontenelle (Brasil), Maiken Wexø (Europe), Daisy Fuentes (Internacional) and Dionne Mitsuoka (Japan) – announced their respective region's Viewer's Choice winner
 Susan Dey and David Cassidy – presented Viewer's Choice
 Ray Cokes – briefly introduced Brazilian Viewer's Choice winners Titãs before a commercial break and told viewers what was 'coming up' on the show
 Flavor Flav and Queen Latifah – presented Best Rap Video
 Magic Johnson – presented the Video Vanguard Award
 Ed Lover and Doctor Dré – appeared in a pre-commercial vignette telling viewers what was 'coming up' on the show
 Paula Abdul – presented Best Male Video
 Mike Patton – was interviewed briefly by Downtown Julie Brown before a commercial break
 Cher – presented Video of the Year

Post-show
 Kurt Loder – introduced the winners of the professional categories

Winners and nominees
Winners are in bold text.

External links
 Official MTV site

References

1990
MTV Video Music Awards
MTV Video Music Awards
1990 in Los Angeles